"Heard It in a Love Song" is a song by The Marshall Tucker Band, from their 1977 album Carolina Dreams; it was written by Toy Caldwell.

Reception
Cash Box praised the "pure-toned vocals" and "excellent work on the flute and guitars."  Record World said it combines "a flavorful mix of rock and country stylings."

Chart history
This was the highest-charting single by The Marshall Tucker Band, reaching number 14 on the Billboard Hot 100 chart on June 11, 1977.  It also reached number 51 on the Country chart and number 25 on the Adult Contemporary chart.
"Heard It in a Love Song" was a bigger hit in Canada, where it reached number 5 on the Pop chart.  It also charted higher on their other corresponding national charts.

Weekly charts

Year-end charts

Personnel
Doug Gray-lead vocals
Toy Caldwell-lead & acoustic guitars
Tommy Caldwell-bass guitar, background vocals 
George McCorkle-rhythm guitar
Paul Riddle-drums
Jerry Eubanks-flute, background vocals
Guest musicians
Paul Hornsby-piano, Hammond organ

Cover versions
Mark Chesnutt, on his 2006 album of the same name 
Country band Crossfire, on their album, Bullistik.

References

1977 singles
The Marshall Tucker Band songs
Mark Chesnutt songs
1977 songs
Capricorn Records singles
Songs about music